Miles: From an Interlude Called Life (or Miles for short) is the third studio album by American hip hop duo Blu & Exile. It was released on 17 July 2020 through Dirty Science Records and is their first full-length album since their 2012 album Give Me My Flowers While I Can Still Smell Them. The release coincides with the 13th anniversary of their debut album Below the Heavens.

Background
Blu & Exile began work on a new album in 2015, originally a trap album sending each other beats and verses through e-mail. This album was ultimately scrapped in 2017 as they decided that it did not feel genuine towards their fanbase. Going back to their roots, they started meeting up in-person again and working on Miles. Around 40 songs were made and the 20 that they thought best suited the record were picked.

On May 2, 2019, the duo released their first single "True & Livin'", announcing the True & Livin' EP to release May 24, 2019. The duo supported the rollout of their EP with the True & Livin' tour which began on May 2, 2019 and ended June 7, 2019. On May 20, 2020, they released their single "Miles Davis" and announced their album titled Miles to release on July 17, 2020. Two other singles titled "Roots of Blue" and "The Feeling" were released in the leadup to the album release.

Track listing

Personnel
 Blu - vocals, writer
 Exile - producer, cuts and scratches
 Eddie Sancho - mixing
 Kelly Hibbert - mastering
 B+ - photography
 Chris Hund - vinyl design

References

2020 albums
Collaborative albums
Blu (rapper) albums
Albums produced by Exile (producer)